The 2020–21 Florida State Seminoles men's basketball team represented Florida State University during the 2020–21 NCAA Division I men's basketball season. The Seminoles were led by head coach Leonard Hamilton, in his 19th year, and played their home games at the Donald L. Tucker Center on the university's Tallahassee, Florida campus as members of the Atlantic Coast Conference.

The Seminoles entered the year as the defending conference champions and were picked to finish the season third in the league with Scottie Barnes and M. J. Walker receiving pre-season recognition.

The Seminoles finished the season 18–7, and 11–4 in ACC play, to finish in second place.  As the second seed in the ACC tournament they earned a bye into the Quarterfinals where they advanced due to COVID-19 issues over Duke, defeated North Carolina in the semifinals, but lost to Georgia Tech in the Finals. They earned an at-large bid to the NCAA tournament as a four seed in the East Region.  They defeated 13-seed UNC Greensboro in the first round and 5-seed Colorado in the second round before losing to 1-seed Michigan in the Sweet Sixteen. Scottie Barnes, Balsa Koprivica, and RaiQuan Gray went on to be selected in the 2021 NBA draft.

Previous season
The Seminoles finished the 2019–20 season with a record of 26–5, 16–4 in ACC play, to finish in first place. The ACC tournament was canceled prior to the team beginning play. The NCAA tournament was subsequently canceled as well due to the coronavirus pandemic. Florida State ended the season ranked in the top five of both polls. On March 14, 2020, the Florida State Senate declared the Florida State Seminoles as the national champions for the 2019–2020 season.

Patrick Williams, Devin Vassell, and Trent Forrest would go on to participate in the 2020 NBA draft.

Offseason

Departures

Incoming transfers

2020 recruiting class

Roster

Schedule

Source:

|-
!colspan=12 style=|Regular season

|-
!colspan=12 style=| ACC tournament

|-
!colspan=12 style=| NCAA tournament

|-

Rankings

*Coaches did not release a Week 2 poll.

Awards
Werner Ladder National Coach of the Year semifinalist
Leonard Hamilton

Watchlists
Bob Cousy Award
Scottie Barnes

Jerry West Award
M. J. Walker

Naismith Trophy
Scottie Barnes

All-ACC

Second Team
M.J. Walker
Third Team
RaiQuan Gray
Scottie Barnes
Freshman Team
Scottie Barnes

ACC Sixth Man of the Year
Scottie Barnes
ACC Freshman of the Year
Scottie Barnes

References

Florida State
Florida State Seminoles men's basketball seasons
Florida State Seminoles men's basketball
Florida State Seminoles men's basketball
Florida State